= Belvedere of Spreading Righteousness =

Building in Forbidden City, China

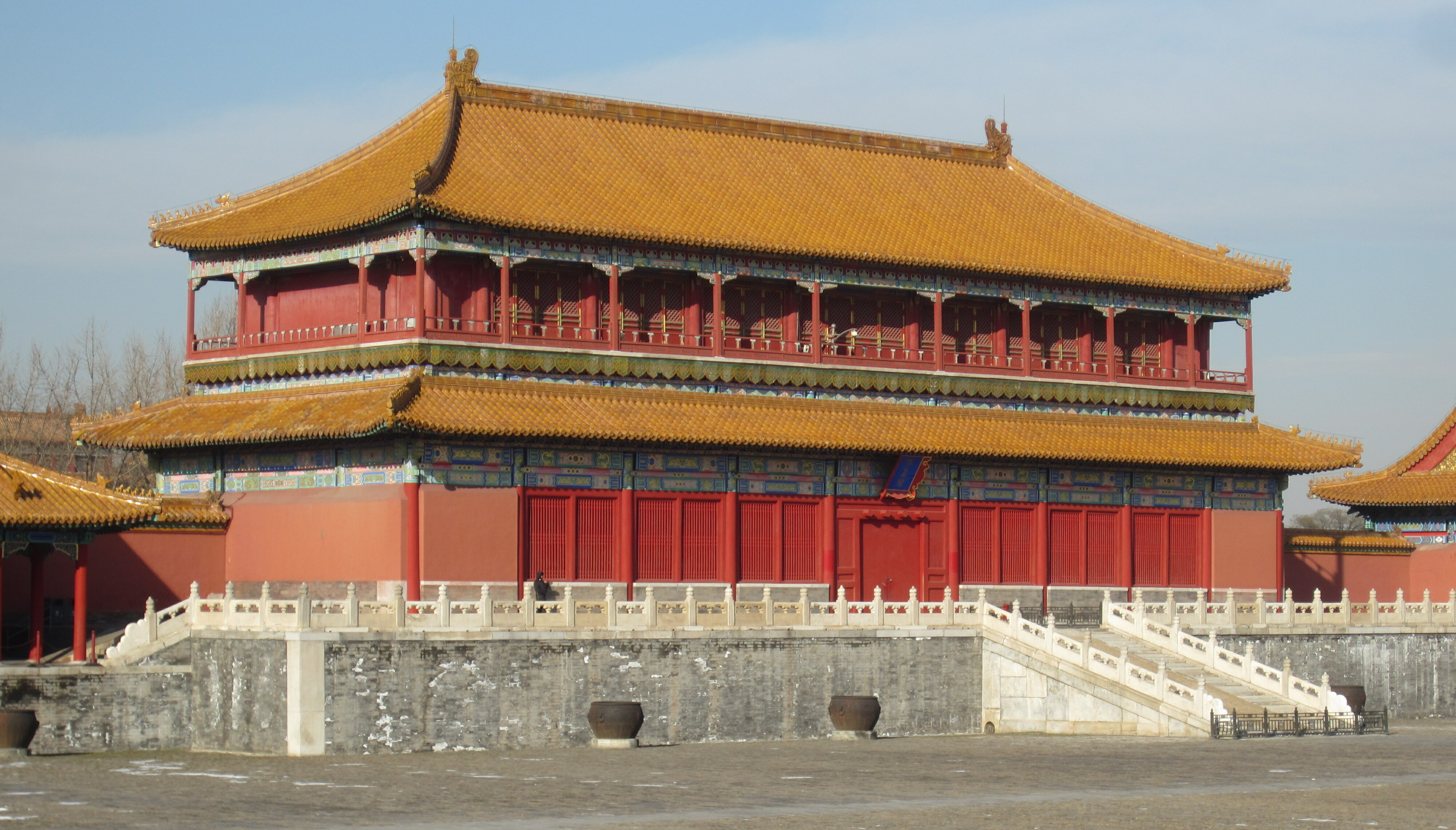
- The building's exterior in November 2016
- Interactive map of the Belvedere of Spreading Righteousness area

General information
- Location: Beijing, China
- Coordinates: 39.91485°N 116.38958°E

The Belvedere of Spreading Righteousness (simplified Chinese: 弘义阁; traditional Chinese: 弘義閣; Manchu: ᠵᡠᡵᡤᠠᠨ ᠪᡝ
ᠰᡝᠯᡤᡳᠶᡝᡵᡝ
ᠠᠰᠠᡵᡳ jurgan be selgiyere asari) is a building in Forbidden City's Outer Court, in Beijing, China.
